Patrick Akutaekwe is a Nigerian powerlifter. He represented Nigeria at the 1992 Summer Paralympics held in Barcelona, Spain, at the 1996 Summer Paralympics held in Atlanta, United States and at the 2000 Summer Paralympics held in Sydney, Australia. He won the bronze medal in the men's 100 kg event at the 1996 Summer Paralympics.

References

External links 
 

Living people
Year of birth missing (living people)
Place of birth missing (living people)
Paralympic powerlifters of Nigeria
Nigerian powerlifters
Powerlifters at the 1992 Summer Paralympics
Powerlifters at the 1996 Summer Paralympics
Powerlifters at the 2000 Summer Paralympics
Medalists at the 1996 Summer Paralympics
Paralympic bronze medalists for Nigeria
Paralympic medalists in powerlifting
20th-century Nigerian people